Frank Eisenhauer (born 9 June 1968 in Augsburg) is a German astronomer and astrophysicist. He is best known for his contributions to interferometry and spectroscopy and the study of the black hole at the centre of the Milky Way.

Life 
Eisenhauer grew up in Augsburg. In 1987, he graduated from the Justus-von-Liebig Gymnasium in Neusäß and then did his military service with the Mountain Signal Battalion 8 in Murnau. Eisenhauer is married with three children and lives in Munich.

Studies 
Eisenhauer studied physics at the Technical University of Munich (1988–1995) and has been working at the Max Planck Institute for Extraterrestrial Physics (MPE) since his diploma thesis in 1995. There, he wrote his doctoral thesis under Reinhard Genzel and received his doctorate from the Ludwig Maximilian University of Munich in 1998. In 2011, Eisenhauer habilitated at the Technical University of Munich.

Teaching 
Eisenhauer is Adjunct Professor at the Technical University of Munich, where he teaches astrophysics and high-resolution astronomy.

Science and research 
As principal investigator of two large astrophysical experiments, Eisenhauer has been instrumental in the development of astronomy with the highest spatial resolution and imaging spectroscopy, contributing in particular to the discovery and study of the black hole at the centre of the Milky Way. At MPE, he now leads the development and scientific evaluation of large astronomical instruments and experiments.

Already in his doctoral thesis, Eisenhauer worked on infrared astronomy and developed an infrared camera with Fabry-Pérot spectrometer for the adaptive optics at the 3.6m telescope of the European Southern Observatory (ESO) in La Silla (Chile). Subsequently, as Principal Investigator, he led the development of the SPIFFI/SINFONI spectrometer at the ESO Very Large Telescope in Paranal (Chile), which, with a then unique combination of adaptive optics and imaging spectroscopy, not only corrects for the interference caused by the Earth's atmosphere, but also simultaneously records a spectrum for each pixel in the image. In 2003, this enabled Eisenhauer and colleagues to measure the distance to the centre of the Milky Way from the orbit of the star S2 for the first time using geometric methods, and by measuring the radial velocities of several stars, they were able to confirm the assumption that a supermassive black hole is located there.

Since 2005, Eisenhauer has been principal investigator of the GRAVITY experiment, which connects the European Southern Observatory's four Very Large Telescopes in Paranal, Chile, together as stellar interferometers, achieving an angular resolution equivalent to that of a 130-metre diameter telescope. Similar to adaptive optics, GRAVITY actively corrects for the interfering influences of the Earth's atmosphere and disturbances in the light path between the telescope and the laboratory, improving sensitivity by several orders of magnitude compared to previous experiments. In 2018, this enabled Eisenhauer and colleagues to detect, in particular, the redshift in the gravitational field of a black hole predicted from Albert Einstein's theory of general relativity. The same team also succeeded in 2020 in detecting the Schwarzschild precession (orbit comparison Newton and Einstein) in the orbit of the star S2. The geometric measurement of the distance to the Galactic centre and the detection of the gravitational redshift in the black hole's gravitational field were confirmed by Andrea Ghez and colleagues with observations at the Keck Observatory on Hawaii.

The SINFONI and GRAVITY instruments are part of the instrument suite employed in the discovery and characterization of the Galactic Center Black Hole, for which Reinhard Genzel and Andrea Ghez have been awarded the 2020 Nobel Prize in Physics.

Other areas of research to which Eisenhauer's observations have contributed include galaxy dynamics in the early universe, active galactic nuclei, and star formation in massive star clusters.

Awards and Honours 

 Gruber Prize in Cosmology 2022  for designing instruments that collected evidence for a black hole at the center of our galaxy
 Stern–Gerlach Medal 2022  of the German Physical Society for the pioneering work in high-resolution infrared astronomy
 Jackson-Gwilt Medal 2022 from the Royal Astronomical Society for the development of astronomical instrumentation
 Foreign associate to the French Academy of Sciences in 2021 
 Tycho Brahe Medal 2021 from the European Astronomical Society for the leadership of the SINFONI and  GRAVITY instruments
 Michelson Investigator Achievement Award 2020 for the groundbreaking results of VLTI-GRAVITY

Memberships 
 International Astronomical Union, Paris
 Astronomical Society, Heidelberg
 European Astronomical Society (EAS), Geneva

References

External links 
 Publications by F. Eisenhauer in Astrophysics Data System
 Erster erfolgreicher Test von Einsteins Allgemeiner Relativitätstheorie nahe supermassereichem Schwarzem Loch - Höhepunkt von 26 Jahren ESO-Beobachtungen des Herzens der Milchstraße 
 Erstes Licht für Instrument zur zukünftigen Beobachtung Schwarzer Löcher - Erfolgreiche Inbetriebnahme von GRAVITY am VLTI 
 Die Beobachtung des Unbeobachtbaren
 Frank Eisenhauer 
 Physics Department, TUM | Eisenhauer, Frank 
 ESO-Teleskop beobachtet Sternentanz um supermassereiches schwarzes Loch und bestätigt Einstein

1968 births
Living people
German astrophysicists
Scientists from Augsburg
Technical University of Munich alumni